Finland competed at the 1936 Summer Olympics in Berlin, Germany. 108 competitors, 103 men and 5 women, took part in 70 events in 14 sports.

Medalists

Gold
Gunnar Höckert (5 000 m)
Ilmari Salminen (10 000 m)
Volmari Iso-Hollo (3 000 m steeplechase)
Kustaa Pihlajamäki (freestyle wrestling 61 kg)
Lauri Koskela (Greco-Roman wrestling 66 kg)
Sten Suvio (boxing welterweight 66,6 kg)
Ale Saarvala (gymnastics - men's horizontal bar)

Silver
Lauri Lehtinen (5 000 m)
Arvo Askola (10 000 m)
Kaarlo Tuominen (3 000 m steeplechase)
Sulo Bärlund (shot put)
Yrjö Nikkanen (javelin throw)
Aarne Reini (Greco-Roman wrestling 61 kg)

Bronze
Volmari Iso-Hollo (10 000 m)
Kalervo Toivonen (javelin throw)
Hermanni Pihlajamäki (freestyle wrestling 66 kg)
Hjalmar Nyström (freestyle wrestling over 87 kg)
Eino Virtanen (Greco-Roman wrestling 72 kg)
Martti Uosikkinen, Heikki Savolainen, Mauri Noroma, Ale Saarvala, Esa Seeste, Ilmari Pakarinen, Einari Teräsvirta, Eino Tukiainen (gymnastics - men's team competition)

Athletics

Boxing

Canoeing

Cycling

Two cyclists, both male, represented Finland in 1936.

Individual road race
 Thor Porko
 Tauno Lindgren

Time trial
 Thor Porko

Diving

Equestrianism

Football

Gymnastics

Modern pentathlon

Three male pentathletes represented Finland in 1936.

 Lauri Kettunen
 Aaro Kiviperä
 Ukko Hietala

Sailing

Shooting

Eight shooters represented Finland in 1936.

25 m rapid fire pistol
 Jaakko Rintanen
 Ville Elo
 Sulo Cederström

50 m pistol
 Tapio Wartiovaara
 Aatto Nuora
 Jaakko Rintanen

50 m rifle, prone
 Bruno Frietsch
 Olavi Elo
 Viljo Leskinen

Swimming

Wrestling

Art competitions

References

External links
Official Olympic Reports
International Olympic Committee results database

Nations at the 1936 Summer Olympics
1936
1936 in Finnish sport